Heermann may refer to:

People with the surname
Adolphus Lewis Heermann (1821–1865), American doctor, naturalist, ornithologist, and explorer
Hugo Heermann (1844–1935), German violinist
Johann Heermann (1585–1647), German poet and hymn-writer
Johann Heermann (politician) (1897–1976), German politician
Lewis Heermann (1779–1833), German, commissioned Surgeon's Mate in the United States Navy in 1802

Other
, a World War II-era Fletcher-class destroyer in the United States Navy

See also
Heermann's gull (Larus heermanni), a gull resident in the United States, Mexico and British Columbia
Heermann's kangaroo rat, (Dipodomys heermanni), a species of rodent in the family Heteromyidae
 Hermann (disambiguation)

Surnames from given names